Sleeper is a 2005 Austrian-German drama film directed by Benjamin Heisenberg. It was screened in the Un Certain Regard section at the 2005 Cannes Film Festival.

Cast

 Bastian Trost - Johannes Mehrveldt
 Mehdi Nebbou - Farid Atabay
 Loretta Pflaum - Beate Werner
 Gundi Ellert - Frau Wasser
 Wolfgang Pregler - Professor Behringer
 Charlotte Eschmann - Johannes' Grandmother
 Ludwig Bang - Secret service agent
 Masayuki Akiyoshi - Fei Li
 Marco Schuler - Robert Königsbauer
 Jürgen Geißendörfer - Markus
 Dominik Dudy - LAN-student
 Andrea Faciu - Singer
 Gordana Stevic - Mrs. Stevic
 Christine Böhm - Mrs. Schmid
 Anke Euler - Animal Nurse

References

External links

2005 films
Austrian drama films
German drama films
2000s German-language films
2005 drama films
Films directed by Benjamin Heisenberg
2000s German films